The 2011-12 NBL season was the 30th season for the Adelaide 36ers in the NBL. After missing out on the playoffs in 2010-11 for the 4th time in the past 5 seasons and finishing the season in 8th position with a worst ever 9-19 record the 36ers, who have won the NBL Championship four times (1986, 1998, 1998–99 and 2001-02) will be looking to get back to a position of power in the league.

The season is the second year of a 3-year contract for head coach Marty Clarke.

The 36ers played their home games at the 8,000 seat Adelaide Arena, their home since 1992. The arena is the largest purpose built basketball venue in Australia and the third largest venue currently used in the NBL behind the Sydney Entertainment Centre (10,517) and the Vector Arena (8,500) in Auckland (NZ).

Off-season

Additions

* Williamson was released by the Adelaide 36ers on 30 September 2011 due to a knee injury. He was replaced by the signing of Diamon Simpson on 10 October.** Everard Bartlett signed as an injury replacement for Nathan Crosswell.

Subtractions
(From the squad at the end of the 2010-11 NBL season)

Current roster

Depth chart

Regular season

Ladder

Game log
 Games with a * are televised on One HD. Games with ** shown on Sky Sport NZ

|- style="background-color:#ffcccc;"
| 1
| 3 September
| Hawks
| L 84-100
| 
| 
| 
| @ Schweppes ArenaUlverstone, Tasmania
| 0-1
|- style="background-color:#ffcccc;"
| 2
| 3 September
| Hawks
| L 81-83
| 
| 
| 
| @ Devenport Basketball StadiumDevonport, Tasmania
| 0-2
|- style="background-color:#bbffbb;"
| 3
| 10 September
| Taipans
| W 91-86
| 
| 
| 
| @ STARplex GawlerAdelaide
| 1-2
|- style="background-color:#bbffbb;"
| 4
| 11 September
| Taipans
| W 87-82
| Darren Ng (23)
| 
| 
| Adelaide Arena1,500
| 2-2

|- style="background-color:#ffcccc;"
| 1
| 22 September
| Blaze
| L 78-94
| 
| 
| 
| @ The Southport SchoolGold Coast
| 0-1
|- style="background-color:#bbffbb;"
| 2
| 23 September
| Kings
| W 96-88
| 
| 
| 
| @ Auchenflower StadiumBrisbane
| 1-1
|- style="background-color:#bbffbb;"
| 2
| 23 September
| Hawks
| W 79-69
| 
| 
| 
| @ Chandler ArenaBrisbane
| 2-1

|- style="background-color:#ffcccc;"
| 1*
| 8 October
| Wildcats
| L 69-102
| Chris Warren (17)
| Stephen Weigh (10)
| Stephen Weigh, Chris Warren, Daniel Johnson, Nathan Crosswell (2)
| Adelaide Arena5,683
| 0-1
|- style="background-color:#ffcccc;"
| 2
| 16 October
| @ Hawks
| L 89-97
| Chris Warren (25)
| Stephen Weigh, Diamon Simpson (6)
| Chris Warren (3)
| WIN Entertainment Centre2,966
| 0-2
|- style="background-color:#ffcccc;"
| 3
| 21 October
| Kings
| L 71-94
| Chris Warren, Daniel Johnson (14)
| Daniel Johnson, Diamon Simpson (9)
| Darren Ng (4)
| Adelaide Arena4,495
| 0-3
|- style="background-color:#bbffbb;"
| 4*
| 28 October
| @ Wildcats
| W 100-92
| Daniel Johnson (22)
| Stephen Weigh (10)
| Nathan Crosswell (4)
| Challenge Stadium4,200
| 1-3

|- style="background-color:#ffcccc;"
| 5**
| 3 November
| @ Breakers
| L 90-99
| Diamon Simpson (20)
| Diamon Simpson (8)
| Nathan Crosswell (7)
| North Shore Events Centre2,893
| 1-4
|- style="background-color:#ffcccc;"
| 6
| 12 November
| Kings
| L 104-113 (OT)
| Daniel Johnson (25)
| Diamon Simpson (10)
| Chris Warren (7)
| Adelaide Arena5,049
| 1-5
|- style="background-color:#bbffbb;"
| 7
| 19 November
| Tigers
| W 95-89
| Stephen Weigh (24)
| Daniel Johnson (13)
| Nathan Crosswell (9)
| Adelaide Arena6,175
| 2-5
|- style="background-color:#ffcccc;"
| 8*
| 26 November
| Blaze
| L 95-89
| Darren Ng (20)
| Diamon Simpson (13)
| Chris Warren (5)
| Adelaide Arena4,708
| 2-6

|- style="background-color:#bbffbb;"
| 9
| 4 December
| @ Wildcats
| W 96-84
| Diamon Simpson (22)
| Daniel Johnson, Diamon Simpson (10)
| Chris Warren (6)
| Challenge Stadium4,000
| 3-6
|- style="background-color:#ffcccc;"
| 10
| 8 December
| @ Kings
| L 103-107 (OT)
| Daniel Johnson (24)
| Daniel Johnson (9)
| Chris Warren, Nathan Crosswell (5)
| Sydney Entertainment Centre3,624
| 3-7
|- style="background-color:#ffcccc;"
| 11
| 11 December
| Breakers
| L 73-86
| Daniel Johnson (17)
| Diamon Simpson (8)
| Nathan Crosswell (4)
| Adelaide Arena4,350
| 3-8
|- style="background-color:#bbffbb;"
| 12*
| 16 December
| Hawks
| W 87-63
| Diamon Simpson (22)
| Diamon Simpson (10)
| Chris Warren (4)
| Adelaide Arena3,597
| 4-8
|- style="background-color:#ffcccc;"
| 13
| 23 December
| @ Blaze
| L 77-96
| Daniel Johnson (24)
| Diamon Simpson (5)
| Nathan Herbert, Chris Warren, Mitch Creek (3)
| Gold Coast Convention Centre3,280
| 4-9
|- style="background-color:#bbffbb;"
| 14*
| 30 December
| @ Kings
| W 96-77
| Daniel Johnson (21)
| Daniel Johnson (14)
| Everard Bartlett (4)
| Sydney Entertainment Centre6,165
| 5-9

|- style="background-color:#ffcccc;"
| 15
| 7 January
| Taipans
| L 67-72
| Diamon Simpson (16)
| Diamon Simpson (12)
| Chris Warren (4)
| Adelaide Arena6,194
| 5-10
|- style="background-color:#ffcccc;"
| 16**
| 13 January
| @ Breakers
| L 63-80
| Chris Warren (14)
| Diamon Simpson (6)
| Chris Warren (2)
| North Shore Events Centre4,400
| 5-11
|- style="background-color:#ffcccc;"
| 17*
| 22 January
| Taipans
| L 74-87
| Stephen Weigh (21)
| Daniel Johnson (9)
| Daniel Johnson (3)
| Adelaide Arena5,076
| 5-12
|- style="background-color:#ffcccc;"
| 18
| 25 January
| @ Crocodiles
| L 69-79
| Daniel Johnson (21)
| Daniel Johnson (16)
| Stephen Weigh, Diamon Simpson (2)
| Townsville Entertainment Centre3,622
| 5-13

|- style="background-color:#ffcccc;"
| 19*
| 3 February
| @ Tigers
| L 81-87
| Chris Warren (31)
| Daniel Johnson (11)
| Chris Warren (4)
| State Netball Centre2,126
| 5-14
|- style="background-color:#ffcccc;"
| 20*
| 5 February
| @ Crocodiles
| L 71-89
| Mitch Creek (19)
| Stephen Weigh (6)
| Mitch Creek (3)
| Townsville Entertainment Centre3,322
| 5-15
|- style="background-color:#bbffbb;"
| 21*
| 12 February
| Crocodiles
| W 79-74
| Daniel Johnson (20)
| Diamon Simpson (12)
| Stephen Weigh (8)
| Adelaide Arena5,072
| 6-15
|- style="background-color:#ffcccc;"
| 22
| 24 February
| Wildcats
| L 79-90
| Daniel Johnson (24)
| Daniel Johnson (8)
| Stephen Weigh (3)
| Adelaide Arena4,255
| 6-16
|- style="background-color:#bbffbb;"
| 23*
| 25 February
| @ Tigers
| W 92-83
| Chris Warren (26)
| Diamon Simpson (10)
| Chris Warren (8)
| State Netball Centre3,500
| 7-16

|- style="background-color:#bbffbb;"
| 24*
| 3 March
| Hawks
| W 77-73
| Daniel Johnson (16)
| Diamon Simpson, Everard Bartlett (6)
| Chris Warren (5)
| Adelaide Arena4,585
| 8-16
|- style="background-color:#ffcccc;"
| 25*
| 10 March
| Breakers
| L 76-91
| Daniel Johnson (21)
| Diamon Simpson (11)
| Everard Bartlett (4)
| Adelaide Arena4,936
| 8-17
|- style="background-color:#ffcccc;"
| 26*
| 17 March
| Blaze
| L 83-84
| Diamon Simpson (21)
| Diamon Simpson (11)
| Chris Warren, Daniel Johnson (3)
| Adelaide Arena5,177
| 8-18
|- style="background-color:#ffcccc;"
| 27
| 23 March
| @ Taipans
| L 75-79
| Diamon Simpson (20)
| Diamon Simpson (16)
| Chris Warren (6)
| Cairns Convention Centre4,813
| 8-19
|- style="background-color:#ffcccc;"
| 28
| 25 March
| @ Hawks
| L 78-92
| Stephen Weigh (15)
| Diamon Simpson, Daniel Johnson (7)
| Daniel Johnson (5)
| WIN Entertainment Centre5,032
| 8-20

Finals
The Adelaide 36ers failed to make the NBL playoffs for the third year in succession.

Player statistics

Regular season

* Ballinger and Crosswell suffered season ending ankle and Achilles tendon injuries respectively in Round 10. Ballinger against the Sydney Kings and Croswell against New Zealand.

Finals

Awards

Player of the Week
 Week 4: Daniel Johnson - 22 points, 6 rebounds, 2 assists and 1 block vs Perth Wildcats @ Challenge Stadium

Player of the Month

Coach of the Month

NBL Award Winners
NBL Most Improved Player - Daniel Johnson
All-NBL Third team -  - Daniel Johnson

Season summary
Along with season ending injuries to the club's captain and vice-captain (Adam Ballinger and Nathan Crosswell) in Round 10, the 36ers performed well at times in 2011-12 but the young team's inability to close out games or win close games saw them ultimately record a club worst ever 8-20 record. For only the second time in its history dating back to when they started as the Adelaide City Eagles in 1982, the club finished the season in last place.

Bright spots for the team were the emergence of centre and the NBL's Most Improved Player for 2012 Daniel Johnson who finally got court time to show his potential and finished the regular season in 3rd place in league average scores (16.5ppg), 5th in rebounding (7.7rpg) and 5th in blocked shots (1.0pg) as well as exciting import power forward Diamon Simpson who led the NBL in shooting percentage (59.2%), was 2nd in blocked shots (1.5pg) was 3rd in rebounding (8.6 rpg). Other bright spots in an otherwise dismal season included rookie import guard Chris Warren (14.2ppg) in his first professional role outside of college, the continued athleticism and defense of youngster Mitch Creek and the outside shooting of veteran Darren Ng.

Adelaide 36ers Awards
 Most Valuable Player (Mark Davis Trophy): Daniel Johnson
 Players Player: Daniel Johnson
 Most Improved Player: Daniel Johnson
 Best Defensive Player: Mitch Creek
 Best Club Person: Carmel Margaritis (Choreographer - 36ers Dancers)

See also
2011-12 NBL season

References

External links
Official Site of the 36ers

Adelaide 36ers
Adelaide 36ers seasons